The black college football national championship is a national championship honor that, since 1920, has been regularly bestowed upon the best football teams among historically black colleges and universities (HBCUs) within the United States.

History

Background
In college football's early years, HBCUs generally lacked the opportunity to compete against predominantly white schools due to segregation, which was practiced in much of the U.S. at the time—leaving HBCUs with few scheduling options other than to play games among themselves only and sponsor their own championships.

The first football game between HBCU schools was played on December 27, 1892. On that day Johnson C. Smith defeated Livingstone College. As it was the only game played by HBCU schools that year, Johnson C. Smith's team could no doubt claim to be that season's HBCU national champions by default. However, the earliest documented claim to such a title was Livingstone's 1906 team, led by captain Benjamin Butler "Ben" Church. It is not immediately clear who exactly determined that Livingstone was the best team—or if they simply declared themselves champions.

Initially, starting in 1920, HBCU national champions were designated by the Pittsburgh Courier at the end of the season. The champions were credited to compilations generated by Courier managing editor William Goldwyn "Bill" Nunn, Jr., Courier sports writer Eric "Ric" Roberts, and Grambling State sports information director Collie "Nick" Nicholson (the Courier was also known to tabulate weekly HBCU rankings in later decades—first by borrowing the Dickinson System, from 1941 to 1950, before abandoning it due to controversy and replacing it with the newspaper's own "Courier Double-rating System" from 1951 onward, into the 1970s).

In 1921 others more directly associated with the schools themselves made their own attempts to crown a champion, coordinating their efforts under the auspices of the Champion Aggregation of All Conferences. The CAAC's initiative was fostered by Paul Jones, who reported the champion annually in his column in Spalding's Intercollegiate Football Guide.

The first prominent game between an HBCU and predominantly white institution occurred in the 1948 Fruit Bowl when Southern defeated San Francisco State, 30–0. Five years later HBCUs began to gravitate over to the National Association of Intercollegiate Athletics because it offered numerous athletic competition options, was oriented primarily toward smaller institutions, and had also begun openly welcoming schools of varying demographic backgrounds as members. At present most HBCUs are now members of the National Collegiate Athletic Association. However, designating an annual black national champion has remained a popular tradition, even as HBCUs have successfully challenged majority white schools for football championships for decades now, within the framework of both NCAA and NAIA competition; this includes Associated Press, United Press International, NCAA, and NAIA-sponsored titles for the 1962, 1973, 1978, 1990, 1992, and 1995 seasons, as well as runner-up finishes in 1963, 1983, 1991, 1994, and 2012.

Noteworthy team accomplishments include the sixteen HBCU championships won all-time by Florida A&M (under five different coaches) and Tennessee State (also under five different coaches) and the five won consecutively by Central State from 1986–90 (all five under coach Billy Joe). Florida A&M has also won titles in nine different decades. Southern (1948), Prairie View A&M (1953), Tuskegee (2000 and 2007), and North Carolina A&T (2017) have each achieved the best single-season won–loss record of 12–0. Winston–Salem State (2012) has achieved the best single-season win total of 14 (with their only loss being in the NCAA Division II national championship game).

Noteworthy coaching accomplishments include the nine HBCU championships won by Joe (seven at Central State and two at Florida A&M), John Merritt (one at Jackson State and eight at Tennessee State), and Eddie Robinson (all nine at Grambling State). Rod Broadway is the only coach to have won titles at three different schools (two at North Carolina Central, one at Grambling, and two at North Carolina A&T). Jay Hopson is the only white coach to have won a title (in 2014, at Alcorn State).

Championship bowl games
Attempts have been made over the years to determine a non-mythical national champion with an actual football game contested by leading teams among HBCUs throughout the United States. The Orange Blossom Classic was often billed as such a game, but Florida A&M, as its annual host, was guaranteed a spot in this game and was not necessarily national championship-caliber each and every year that it was played (indeed, the Rattlers were even accused of taking advantage of a system where most selectors—at the time—named their national champions before postseason bowl games; if the Rattlers were not named champs by any selector after the regular season, then they still got a second chance at the claim by winning the Orange Blossom Classic).

Contests including the Colored Championship games of 1920 and 1923 (which happened to feature members of the Central Intercollegiate Athletic Association, although the games were not played for the conference title), the Chocolate Bowl (1935), the Steel and Vulcan bowls (1940–41), the National Bowl (1947), and the National Football Classic (1954) were attempted periodically but without any sustained success.

The Pelican Bowl, a bowl game that tried to match up the conference champions from the Mid-Eastern Athletic Conference (MEAC) and the Southwestern Athletic Conference (SWAC), was another such example—and actually did manage to last several seasons—but even this venture failed to draw enough attendance and lasted only a few years in the 1970s. Similarly, the Heritage Bowl was played in the 1990s featuring teams from the MEAC and SWAC, but this bowl game has not been held since 1999 and was often snubbed by the conference champions in lieu of the NCAA's Division I-AA playoffs; indeed, five teams of the Heritage Bowl era were still able to claim black national titles from various selectors after declining their bids to the bowl game.

Celebration Bowl
The MEAC and SWAC began negotiations in 2010 to create a successor called the "Legacy Bowl"—not to be confused with the later exhibition game with the same name—to begin during the 2011 postseason, but it was voted down by MEAC officials. However, in 2015, the first Celebration Bowl was played, pitting the champions of both conferences. While the Celebration Bowl's trophy itself only includes the inscription "Celebration Bowl Champions," the bowl's creator (ESPN), as well as its title sponsor (Air Force Reserve) and other prominent sponsors, have indicated that it is for the HBCU national title—as have coaches of participating teams, the two competing conferences, and even the NCAA. However, with Tennessee State being a member of the Ohio Valley Conference (OVC), the Celebration Bowl could not fully represent all HBCUs within the NCAA's Football Championship Subdivision. Further more, Hampton and North Carolina A&T both have since withdrawn from the MEAC (after the 2017 and 2019 seasons) to join the Big South Conference—despite watching Tennessee State's program struggle to a losing record in games played since joining the OVC in 1988—primarily because of revenue sharing and the opportunity to play in the NCAA Division I playoffs. This is not the first time that some individual schools have been isolated from the HBCU championship process; in 1960 the Associated Negro Press stated: "A total of 76 Negro colleges played football during the past season. Cheyney State and Langston were not considered in (our) rating because most of their games were against non-Negro colleges."

In other sports
Black national champions have been crowned regularly in football for more than a century, and the concept has also caught on with other sports, including HBCU baseball and HBCU men and women's basketball teams. There are also HBCU tournaments for golf and tennis.

Selectors
Not all black national championships are determined the same way. Early poll rankings were for the best overall HBCU, while bowl games often matched champions of only two specific HBCU conferences. However, the NCAA and NAIA later split into divisions, and newer selectors have tended to rank HBCU members by division only (e.g., the FCS level of NCAA Division I, NCAA Division II). The variations between how champions have been selected over the years has not been completely without controversy—partly because of the issue of NCAA Division II and NAIA schools being ranked higher than FCS schools and partly because of the concern that the voters in the polls may not necessarily be well-informed about so many different schools. However, the issue may have been somewhat ameliorated when American Sports Wire began limiting HBCU champions to FCS-level schools only in an era when an NAIA school (Central State) held a stranglehold over the overall HBCU championship—possibly in part because NAIA schools were not effected by the NCAA's Proposition 48, a then-new rule that had concerned some educators about its impact on black student-athletes.

The impact of the Pelican, Heritage, and Celebration bowls cannot be overstated, however. In the 16 seasons (through 2018) that those bowl games were held, MEAC or SWAC schools were named overall HBCU champions almost exclusively; only in 1992 did a school with no ties to the MEAC or SWAC even earn a share of the overall HBCU championship—two selectors still chose a SWAC school as the overall champion but one selector did choose Central State (which had won the NAIA Division I national championship). Also, in 1994 soon-to-be MEAC member Hampton was named HBCU overall champ by a single selector while five other selectors gave the title to full MEAC member South Carolina State.

Notes: *—the Pelican Bowl (played 1972 and 1974–75) and Heritage Bowl (played 1991–99) were intended as black national championship games matching the outright champions or top-seeded co-champions of the MEAC and SWAC conferences, but in practice the top seeds often declined their automatic bids to participate in the NCAA playoffs instead—only the 1972, 1975, and 1994 games matched the top seeds of both conferences as originally intended, although the Pelican Bowl is known to have been promoted as a black national championship game all three seasons (in 1991, however, the Heritage Bowl's committee intentionally issued the MEAC's bid to its second-seeded co-champion, because one of the top-seeded co-champion's conference wins had been determined by a forfeit, instead of on the field); **—the Steel Bowl/Vulcan Bowl (played after the 1940–48 and 1951 seasons) is known to have been promoted as a black national championship game after the 1940 and 1941 seasons

Yearly national championship selections

Note: *—source is the College Football Data Warehouse, unless stated otherwise

National championships by school

See also
 Black players in professional American football
 History of African Americans in the Canadian Football League
 Racial issues faced by black quarterbacks
 List of black quarterbacks
 Black participation in college basketball
 List of African-American sports firsts

References

College football championships
African-American sports history